Mrs. President may refer to:
Mr. President (title) or Mrs. President
A title historically used to refer to the First Lady of the United States
Abigail Adams, second First Lady of the United States, sometimes referred to as "Mrs. President"
Mrs. President (opera), an opera about Victoria Woodhull composed by Victoria Bond

See also
Mr. President (disambiguation)